Pu Si Lung (Núi Pu Si Lung, sometimes Phu Si Lung, Phu Xi Lùng), is a mountain in Southeast Asia on the international border between China and Vietnam. The peak, narrowly on the Vietnamese side, is 3,076 metres tall.

The mountain is in the xã (commune) Pa Vệ Sử, Mường Tè District, Lai Châu Province. It is adjacent to Pu Tả Tông (2,109 m) and Pu Đen Đinh (1,886 m).

References

 Peakbagger listing

Mountains of Vietnam
International mountains of Asia
China–Vietnam border
Landforms of Lai Châu province